Terwilliger Hot Springs, also known as Cougar Hot Springs, are geothermal pools in the Willamette National Forest in the U.S. state of Oregon,  east of Eugene. The springs drain into Rider Creek, which in turn drains into Cougar Reservoir. They are about a quarter mile from Forest Service Road 19, also known as Aufderheide Memorial Drive. The hot springs are managed by American Land & Leisure.

Visitors over the years built up four pools out of river stones. The pools are on a hillside and cascade from one to the next so that each pool step lower is cooler than the one above it. The pool floors are mostly bedrock but some gravel, sand and debris remain at the bottom of the pools. The pools are closed Thursday mornings for weekly cleaning by the concessionaire.

The pools were renovated in 2009. A group of volunteers, led by a Eugene-based stonemason, removed concrete and built pools using a natural mortar. The new walls will be more stable and easier for volunteers to clean. The renovated pools, the construction of which cost an estimated $40,000, are expected to last for generations.

Access to the springs is subject to a fee. Since 2012, the rates have been $6 per person per day or $60 per person for a seasonal pass to visit. Clothing in the bathing areas is optional, and access is permitted for day use only.  Pets are not allowed at the pools, but there is a designated area before the pools where pets can be tied up.

On December 21, 2017 a landslide blocked the road that provides access to the hot springs from the north. The road will be closed indefinitely. At the time, southern access was blocked by winter road conditions and construction, making the hot springs inaccessible to the public.  

On August 19, 2018 a fire was reported in the area near Terwilliger Hot Springs. The fire damaged the trail to the springs and the surrounding area. The hot springs were re-opened on July 1, 2019.

References

External links
Willamette National Forest: Terwilliger Hot Springs

Hot springs of Oregon
Bodies of water of Lane County, Oregon
Willamette National Forest